Oskaloosa High School may refer to:

United States
 Oskaloosa High School (Iowa) in Oskaloosa, Iowa
 Oskaloosa High School (Kansas) in Oskaloosa, Kansas